The 1991 African Cup of Champions Clubs was the 27th edition of the annual international club football competition held in the CAF region (Africa), the African Cup of Champions Clubs. It determined that year's club champion of association football in Africa.

Club Africain from Tunisia won that final, and became for the first time CAF club champion.

Preliminary round

|}
1 Jadidka withdrew.

First round

|}
1 Brewery withdrew.
2 ASF Fianarantsoa withdrew after 1st leg.

Second round

|}

Quarter-finals

|}

Semi-finals

|}

Final

Champion

Top scorers

The top scorers from the 1991 African Cup of Champions Clubs are as follows:

References
RSSSF.com

1
African Cup of Champions Clubs